Elles et Moi (English: Them and Me) is a 2008 French-Spanish film directed by Bernard Stora and divided into two parts.

Synopsis 
January 1939. The fall of Barcelona declares the defeat of the Spanish Republicans, and 500,000 choose exile. Arriving in France, the men are disarmed and interned in camps, and their families are moved by the government to makeshift camps, many in Ardèche. Elles et Moi follows the fate of the Esteva family during those terrible months and the five years of war that will follow.

While Lluis refuses to accept defeat and dreams of a future victory, Pilar seeks above all to survive and raise her children, Isabel and Ignacio. She knows that this new country will be theirs for a long time and despite the difficulties, she tries to integrate. Sixty years later, Isabel Esteva, having become a world-famous fashion designer, remembers her troubled life.

Technical Details 
 Genre: Drama
 Runtime: 119 min. (1st part); 103 min. (2nd part)
 Digital High Definition – 5.1 sound
 Country:  and 
 Director: Bernard Stora
 Original Screenplay: Bernard Stora and Leny Bernard
 Dialogues: Bernard Stora

Cast 

 Ariadna Gil: Pilar Esteva
 Àstrid Bergès-Frisbey: Isabel Esteva
 Danielle Darrieux: Isabel Esteva, at 80
 Montserrat Carulla: Esperanza, the mother of Pilar
 Julie Depardieu: Alice Brunetti
 Jean-Pierre Marielle: Emile de Montellier
 Nicolas Vaude: Henri de Montellier
 Martine Chevallier: Blanche de Montellier
 Isabelle Sadoyan: Madame Bonel
 Guillaume Gallienne: Robert
 Bernard Blancan: Rafael
 Luis Rego: Jo Morales
 Serge Riaboukine: Warrant Rouquette
 Anouchka Vézian: Woman of the station in Le Pouzin

External links 
 Site France 2  
 
 Fiche AlloCiné  
 Site Espagne au Coeur  

Catalan-language films
2000s French-language films
2008 drama films
2008 films
French drama films
Spanish drama films
2000s French films